Stefan Milić (born 6 July 2000) is a Montenegrin professional footballer who plays as a defender for Septemvri Sofia, on loan from Dinamo Zagreb.

Club career
A youth academy product of Budućnost Podgorica, Milić made his senior team debut on 31 March 2018 in a 1–1 draw against Kom. He scored his first goal on 12 August 2018 in a 3–0 win against Mornar. Despite interest from Partizan, Red Bull Salzburg, Osijek and Mladá Boleslav, Croatian club Dinamo Zagreb announced the signing of Milić on 18 February 2020 on a permanent transfer. He spent the rest of the 2019–20 season on loan at Budućnost.

On 21 July 2020, Milić officially joined Dinamo Zagreb. He made his debut for the club on 16 August in a 6–0 win against Lokomotiva. On 23 September, he was loaned out to Varaždin until the end of the season. He became the second Montenegrin player at Varaždin, after Vladan Adžić. He returned to Dinamo during the winter break. During the second half of the season, Milić primarily played for Dinamo's second team. On 28 April 2021, he scored the first goal in a 3–0 victory over Osijek II. On 22 May, he scored his debut goal for Dinamo's first team in a 1–0 victory over Šibenik.

International career
Milić was a Montenegrin youth international.

Career statistics

Club

Honours
Budućnost Podgorica
Montenegrin First League: 2019–20
Montenegrin Cup: 2018–19

Dinamo Zagreb
Croatian First League: 2020–21

References

External links
 

2000 births
Living people
Footballers from Podgorica
Association football defenders
Montenegrin footballers
Montenegro youth international footballers
Montenegro under-21 international footballers
FK Budućnost Podgorica players
GNK Dinamo Zagreb players
NK Varaždin (2012) players
GNK Dinamo Zagreb II players
NK Bravo players
FC Septemvri Sofia players
Montenegrin First League players
Croatian Football League players
First Football League (Croatia) players
Slovenian PrvaLiga players

Montenegrin expatriate footballers
Montenegrin expatriate sportspeople in Croatia
Expatriate footballers in Croatia
Montenegrin expatriate sportspeople in Slovenia
Expatriate footballers in Slovenia
Montenegrin expatriate sportspeople in Bulgaria
Expatriate footballers in Bulgaria